Dayton is an unincorporated community and census-designated place (CDP) located within South Brunswick, in Middlesex County, New Jersey, United States. At the 2010 United States Census, the CDP's population was 7,063.

Dayton has a post office with its own ZIP code (08810) that encompasses the entire CDP, as well as some surrounding areas. The community was named for William L. Dayton, a local attorney who  later served in the United States Senate or for Jonathan Dayton, the youngest person to sign the United States Constitution, who later served as a United States Senator from New Jersey. The area had been known as Cross Roads and was renamed in 1866 to avoid confusion with mail that was sent to another post office that shared the name.

Geography
According to the United States Census Bureau, the CDP had a total area of 2.102 square miles (5.443 km2), including 2.099 square miles (5.436 km2) of land and 0.003 square miles (0.007 km2) of water (0.13%).

Demographics

Census 2010

Census 2000
At the 2000 census, there were 6,235 people, 2,061 households and 1,690 families living in the CDP. The population density was 1,130.2/km2 (2,929.2/mi2). There were 2,252 housing units at an average density of 408.2/km2 (1,058.0/mi2). The racial makeup of the CDP was 61.54% White, 9.90% African American, 0.22% Native American, 25.04% Asian, 0.05% Pacific Islander, 1.30% from other races, and 1.96% from two or more races. Hispanic or Latino of any race were 5.15% of the population.

There were 2,061 households, of which 52.7% had children under the age of 18 living with them, 68.9% were married couples living together, 10.4% had a female householder with no husband present, and 18.0% were non-families. 14.3% of all households were made up of individuals, and 3.3% had someone living alone who was 65 years of age or older. The average household size was 3.03 and the average family size was 3.36.

31.8% of the population were under the age of 18, 6.0% from 18 to 24, 37.3% from 25 to 44, 19.7% from 45 to 64, and 5.2% who were 65 years of age or older. The median age was 34 years. For every 100 females, there were 93.2 males. For every 100 females age 18 and over, there were 90.2 males.

The median household income was $79,050 and the median family income was $83,024. Males had a median income of $56,892 versus $43,500 for females. The per capita income for the CDP was $28,924. About 1.9% of families and 2.4% of the population were below the poverty line, including 1.5% of those under age 18 and 2.7% of those age 65 or over.

As part of the 2000 Census, 15.72% of Dayton's residents identified themselves as being Indian American. This was the fourth-highest percentage of Indian people in any place in the United States with 1,000 or more residents identifying themselves as being of Indian ancestry.

Economy
Companies headquartered or with office in Dayton include:
 Accutest Laboratories, a provider of environmental analytical services to the consulting community, the petroleum, oil, gas and chemical industry and government clients.
 Aurobindo Pharma USA, Inc. - Pharmaceutical Distribution Center.
 Aurolife Pharma LLC - Pharmaceutical Manufacturing Center.
 GMB North America, Inc.
 Haddad Brands, a privately held family business involved in apparel and accessories.

Transportation
County Route 522 crosses through the community and U.S. Route 130 travels along the neighborhood's eastern edge. The New Jersey Turnpike, U.S. Route 1, and New Jersey Route 32 are accessible just outside of Dayton.

Notable people

People who were born in, residents of, or otherwise closely associated with Dayton include:
 Ed Moran (born 1981), retired track and road runner who specialized in various long-distance disciplines who was a gold medalist in the 5000-meter race at the 2007 Pan American Games.
 Sydney Schneider (born 1999), goalkeeper for the UNC Wilmington Seahawks and the Jamaica women's national football team.

References

External links

George Washington and the History of Dayton
Dayton History

Census-designated places in Middlesex County, New Jersey
South Brunswick, New Jersey